MS Pride of Canterbury is a cross-channel ferry operated by P&O Ferries between Dover and Calais.

History
MS Pride of Canterbury was the second of four 'European Class' freight ferries ordered for P&O European Ferries' Dover-Zeebrugge route. Between 1992 and 2002 she sailed between Dover and Zeebrugge for P&O European Ferries and later P&O Stena Line.  She was converted in the winter of 2002/spring 2003 and re-entered service as Pride of Canterbury (replacing the ageing P&OSL Canterbury). She currently sails from Dover to Calais.

On 31 January 2008 she struck the wreck of  while manoeuvring into The Downs off the Kent coast during heavy weather. The collision caused the loss of one of her propellers and damaged the prop shaft and gear box. Although she was able to sail to Dover unaided, the ferry required assistance berthing. Following emergency repairs in Falmouth she returned to service operating with only 1 propeller. As a result, she was unable to operate in rough weather and was frequently laid up in Dover or sheltering off the Kent coast waiting for the wind to drop. The ferry was due to be drydocked at a European repair yard in November 2008 to be fitted with a new propeller with a view to being back in service for the Christmas 2008 period. The vessel is now back in service again on the Dover to Calais route.

On 29 September 2014 a fire broke out in the engine room at around 8am as it arrived into Calais. The fire was quickly extinguished by the ship's fire protection system. Nobody was injured and the ship disembarked all the passengers safely. The stricken ferry was taken to Arno Shipyard in Dunkerque for repairs; to make up for the missing ship, Pride of Burgundy's services were increased from three to five.

In early 2019, the Pride of Canterbury, like all P&O vessels on the Dover-to-Calais route, has been flagged out to Cyprus, a measure explained by the company as motivated by tax advantages in view of Brexit. She is now registered in Limassol.

On 21 March 2022 Transport Secretary Grant Shapps MP announced that he will require P&O Ferries to rename Pride of Canterbury and other ships on the fleet which carry British names if the company is found to have breached employment regulations following the summary dismissal without notice via Zoom of 800 British seafarers to be replaced with cheaper overseas agency workers. On 24 March 2022, P&O Ferries CEO Peter Hebblethwaite confirmed that the management of the company illegally fired 800 British seafarers so it is expected that this ship will now have to have its name changed as Grant Shapps announced three days previously.

Sister ships
As built, European Pathway was identical to European Seaway and European Highway. The fourth 'European Class' freight ferry was converted to a multi-purpose vessel for the Dover-Calais route and named  though she still retained a number of similarities.  Following conversion to multi-purpose ship, Pride of Canterbury is nearly identical to Pride of Kent.

 (formerly European Highway)

Pride of Canterbury and Pride of Kent are commonly known as the 'Darwin Twins' or 'Darwins' after the project name given by P&O to the conversion of the ships.

References

Ferries of the United Kingdom
Ferries of France
Connections across the English Channel
1991 ships
Ships of P&O Ferries
Maritime incidents in 2008
Maritime incidents in 2014